Osnabrück University of Applied Sciences (German: Hochschule Osnabrück, formerly Fachhochschule Osnabrück) is a university of applied science in Lower Saxony, whose administrative centre is in Osnabrück. It has existed in its current form since 2003, having originally opened in 1971. Some of its departments can be traced back to engineering schools and other colleges operating as early as the 1950s.

Since 1 January 2003, the Osnabrück University of Applied Sciences has been a foundation with legal capacity under public law (§1 Stiftung FH-Osnabrück Verordnung, abbreviated in law to StiftVO-FHOS). The university is made up of four departments along with the Institute of Music; it offers 68 Bachelor's and 31 Master's study programmes (including post-professional courses) in a wide variety of subjects. The university has sites in the Osnabrück districts of Westerberg and Haste along with another site in Lingen in Emsland, which is due to be expanded under the terms of the Hochschulpakt 2020 (University Pact 2020) programme. The lecture halls, seminar rooms and laboratories belonging to the schools of Engineering and Computer Science and Business Management and Social Sciences are located on Albrechtstraße and Caprivistraße in Westerberg. The School of Agricultural Sciences and Landscape Architecture and its teaching buildings, laboratories, greenhouses and trial operations are located in the Haste district, in the middle of a 5-hectare park on the verge of the Wiehen Hills, they are a hill range in North Rhine-Westphalia and Lower Saxony in Germany.

History 

Today's University of Applied Sciences has its origins in previous tertiary education institutions. The present-day School of Engineering and Computer Science arose from the “Staatlichen Ingenieurschule Osnabrück” (Osnabrück State Engineering School), which was founded in 1962. The School of Agricultural Sciences and Landscape Architecture  has its roots in the “Höhere Landbauschule” (an agricultural college) in Quakenbrück which was founded in 1936. This institution moved to Osnabrück on 1952 and was renamed the “Ingenieurschule für Landbau” (Agricultural Engineering School) in 1964, later being incorporated into the Fachhochschule Osnabrück. The modern-day Institute of Music arose from the “Städtischen Konservatorium Osnabrück” (Osnabrück Public Music Academy) which was founded in 1919; in 1996 it became a part of the Fachhochschule.

In 1971 the “Fachhochschule Osnabrück” was founded as an amalgamation of the various predecessor institutions; the economics department was established at this time. In 1987 the Fachhochschule established the Federal Republic’s first ever professorship of nursing science, whose inaugural holder was Ruth Schröck.

From 1995 to 2000, the Fachhochschule was one of the model higher education institutions featured in the initiative “Modellvorhaben für eine Erprobung der globalen Steuerung von Hochschulhaushalten in Niedersachsen” (Model Projects for a Trial of Global Management of University Budgets in Lower Saxony), whose results have since been integrated into legislation concerning higher education in the state.

The university's transfer over to the foundation set up in its name (“Stiftung Fachhochschule Osnabrück”) in 2003 brought about various organizational changes, such as the establishment of a foundation council (chaired by Helga Schuchardt). By 2006, the new foundation of the Fachhochschule had become one of the largest public law foundations in Germany by expenditure.

The new building on the Caprivi Campus in Westerberg was dedicated in 2004; the School of Business Management and Social Sciences has been using the barracks grounds since 1998. The signage system on the Caprivi Campus was designed by Andreas Uebele. That year also saw the start of the German Network for Quality Development in Care, whose offices are located at the Osnabrück University of Applied Sciences and whose role is to develop care and national expert standards in this sector.

When Lower Saxony's new Higher Education Act came into force in September 2010, the “Fachhochschule Osnabrück” was renamed the “Hochschule Osnabrück”. In addition, the winter semester of 2010/11 saw the number of students at the University of Applied Sciences surpass 10,000.

Today's School of Engineering and Computer Science (in German Ingenieurwissenschaften und Informatik, abbreviated to IuI) arose from the earlier schools of engineering, electrical engineering and computer science as well as materials and processes. The School of Business Management and Social Sciences (in German Wirtschafts- und Sozialwissenschaften, abbreviated to WiSo) arose from the previous school of economics, the Institute for Public Management, the Institute for Public Administration (offering professional qualifications for higher service) and the Institute for Healthcare Professionals. The School of Agricultural Sciences and Landscape Architecture arose from the two individual schools offering those subjects. In 2001, the School of Management, Culture and Technology was established as part of a new organisational superstructure at the Lingen site; it arose from the former schools for Communication and Society, Management and Technology and also the Department for Dual Courses (a cooperative venture with the Emsland Vocational Academy). The new Lingen campus was opened in October 2012, following the extension of halls 1 and 2 of the former repair workshop in Lingen.

During the winter semester of 2011/12, WiSo introduced its new Applied Economics (BA) course – the first of its kind in Germany. In February 2012, the cooperative research college “FamiLE – Familiengesundheit im Lebensverlauf” (Family Health in the Course of Life) was founded in conjunction with the University of Witten/Herdecke.

On 19 April 2013, the groundbreaking for the extension of the University of Applied Science (and the University of Osnabrück) into Westerberg took place. Lower Saxony's Ministry of Education and Culture invested approximately 23 million euro in the lecture theatre; for the entire new campus, roughly 80 million euro worth of further investment is expected.

Departments and courses 

 School of Agricultural Sciences and Landscape Architecture, Haste district
 School of Business Management and Social Sciences, Westerberg district, Osnabruck
 School of Engineering and Computer Science (IuI), Westerberg district, Osnabrück
 School of Management, Culture and Technology (Lingen Campus)
 Business Administration and Management (B.A.)
 Institute of Music at the Osnabrück University of Applied Sciences (IfM)

Research 

A number of core areas for internal research were allocated for 2012 in order to focus the university's research activities and encourage more successful projects with greater potential for innovation. At present the university has 12 main research areas:
 Forschungszentrum Energiewirtschaft Energierecht (Research Centre for the Energy Industry and Energy Law)
 KOMOBAR – Decision Strategies and Communicative Structures for Cooperative Mobile Work Machines in Agriculture
 Mobile Communications
 Applied Research Focus – Automated Systems
 Intelligent Sensor Systems
 Precision Farming als Instrument der interdisziplinären potenzialorientierten Landnutzung  (Precision Farming as an Instrument for Interdisciplinary, Potential-Oriented Land Use)
 Optimisation of Business Processes in the Logistics Chain
 Patient- and Client-oriented Concepts for the Systemisation of Nursing Practice
 Development and Implementation of Expert Standards in Care
 Reproductive Health for Women and Families
 Konzeptionierung und Einführung einer praxisintegrierenden elektronischen Lernbasis (Conception and Introduction of Practice-Integrated, Electronic Learning Methods)
 SafeConnect

From 2012 to 2016, the Volkswagen Foundation agreed to give Osnabrück University of Applied Sciences around 1 million euro to assist with the soil science research project “Rüwola” in cooperation with the HAWK University of Hildesheim/Holzminden/Göttingen. In December 2011, eight research applications from the University of Applied Sciences for grants from the European Regional Development Fund (with a total value of roughly 1 million euro) were approved.

Through cooperative initiatives such as the „FamiLe – Familiengesundheit im Lebensverlauf“ research college, students are given the opportunity to undertake doctoral studies following the completion of their courses.

The Waldhof test operation of the School of Agricultural Sciences and Landscape Architecture, based in Wallenhorst, is the home of Competence Center ISOBUS e.V., a registered association promoting technological development, quicker practical farming and also the international implementation of ISOBUS, an agricultural communication system.

International collaborations 

Most of the university's schools offer courses with a European or international basis, along with a year abroad at one of the institution's many partner universities.

In cooperation with Buckinghamshire New University in the United Kingdom, the School of Business Management and Social Sciences offers an MBA programme. It is a three-year part-time course with attendance periods and enables students to acquire understanding of management and leadership abilities. Lecturers for this course consist of academics from partner universities along with business experts. Graduates will receive a double diploma: one which awards them the title of Master of Business Administration from both Bucks New and Osnabrück University of Applied Sciences. The British partner university is located in High Wycombe in Buckinghamshire.

Osnabrück University of Applied Sciences also collaborates with universities in China; alongside Hefei University, an international study course in logistics management (called “LOGinCHINA”) is offered – this is based on Osnabrück's Business Administration and Management (B.A.) course. Along with Münster's university of applied sciences and the Saxion Hogeschool in Enschede, Netherlands, an MBA course in International Supply Chain Management is offered. In cooperation with Beijing Normal University, the Danube University Krems and the University of Tempere, an Erasmus+ Joint master's degree (Master in Research and Innovation in Higher Education) was introduced in 2012.

The university is one of seven members of the German university federation “Alliance for Excellence” (UAS7).

Study conditions 

In contrast to other universities (including applied science universities), the ratio of lecturers to students is very good at Osnabrück University of Applied Sciences. Its campus has many green areas. There are numerous older buildings on the site; however many have been (and are presently being) renovated. The Terrassenfest music festival – also popular beyond the student body – takes place in April and May every year. In the 2005 CHE rankings, the Business Law course was rated among the best; in the 2007 CHE Bachelors rankings, two courses offered by the School of Business Management and Social Sciences also achieved high rankings.

Osnabrück University of Applied Sciences takes part in the Formula Student Germany racing competition, sending an interdisciplinary team (named the “Ignition Racing Team”) made up of around 41 students from the Schools of Engineering and Computer Science and Business Management and Social Sciences.

Personalities and alumni

Notable teachers and former teachers 

 Kurt Bodewig, honorary professor in traffic logistics
 Helge Breloer, lectureship in auditing and determining wood value
 Andreas Frey
 Heinz Rudolf Kunze
 Roland Pröll
 Florian Weber

Notable graduates 

 Reinhold Hilbers, member of the Landtag of Lower Saxony
 Anne Ross, singer
 Jendrik Sigwart, singer
 Rainer Spiering, member of the Bundestag
 Aloys Wobben, electrical engineer, former owner and manager of Enercon

The University  in film and TV 
In the (Charlotte) Lindholm-centred 2007 Tatort episode  (The Nameless Girl), which takes place in Osnabrück, the murder victim attends a course at the university. Filming took place in August and September 2006 at various locations including Haste, the University of Osnabrück and also at a student residence. The Caprivi campus of the School of Business Msnagement and Social Sciences is also featured in the 2008 made-for-TV film “Vertraute Angst” (Familiar Fear) from ARD, in which it is used as the setting for a psychiatric clinic.

In 2007, filming of the 2008 documentary drama “Remarque – Sein Weg zum Ruhm” (Remarque – His Path to Fame) took place at the Caprivi campus; it revolves around the author Erich Maria Remarque, who underwent military training at the Caprivi barracks in Osnabrück.

See also 
 List of universities in Germany
 University of Osnabruck

Links 
 Osnabrück University of Applied Sciences – official website
 Osnabrück University of Applied Sciences – Students’ Union website

References 

Osnabrück University of Applied Sciences
Educational institutions established in 1971
Buildings and structures in Osnabrück
Universities of Applied Sciences in Germany